John Henninger Reagan (1818–1905) was a U.S. Senator from Texas from 1887 to 1891. Senator Reagan may also refer to:

John Reagan (New Hampshire politician) (born 1946), New Hampshire State Senate
Michele Reagan (born 1969), Arizona State Senate

See also
Senator Regan (disambiguation)